Tsentralny (masculine), Tsentralnaya (feminine), or Tsentralnoye (neuter) may refer to:
Tsentralny District (disambiguation), several districts in the countries of the former Soviet Union
Tsentralny Okrug (disambiguation), various divisions in Russia
Tsentralny Urban Settlement, a municipal formation which the Work Settlement of Tsentralny in Volodarsky District of Nizhny Novgorod Oblast, Russia is incorporated as
Tsentralnoye Urban Settlement, a municipal formation which the Work Settlement of Tsentralny in Miloslavsky District of Ryazan Oblast, Russia is incorporated as
Tsentralny (inhabited locality) (Tsentralnaya, Tsentralnoye), several inhabited localities in Russia
Tsentralnyi, Luhansk Oblast (Tsentralny), an urban-type settlement in Luhansk Oblast, Ukraine